Ahmad Jassim Mohammed (born 4 May 1960) is an Iraqi football goalkeeper who played for Iraq in the 1986 FIFA World Cup. He also played for Al-Rasheed Club.

Ahmad Jassim started his career with Al-Zawraa and played for Al-Rasheed, Al-Naft and Al-Talaba.  Ahmad was called up by Brazilian coach Evaristo de Macedo into Iraq’s World Cup squad as an understudy to both Raad Hammoudi of Al-Shurta and Al-Jaish’s veteran keeper Fatah Nsaief.

References

External links
 FIFA profile

1960 births
Iraqi footballers
Iraq international footballers
Association football goalkeepers
1986 FIFA World Cup players
Footballers at the 1988 Summer Olympics
Olympic footballers of Iraq
Living people